Suleimane Baio (born 12 August 1983 in Conakry, Guinea) is a Guinean-born Bissau-Guinean footballer who played for a number of teams including Spain's CD Numancia.

Career

Spain

New to the Segunda División's CD Numancia for 2006/07, Baio was said to not have been disciplined and eager to learn at Los Numantinos, fielded four times and hitting the crossbar once despite a hat-trick at the friendly Torneo Triangular de Miranda 2006. Axed from Numancia at the finish of the season, he resorted to UD Villa de Santa Brígida but was dropped winter 2007.

Albania

Slotting two goals in a 2-1 friendly success over Olimpiku Tiranë which captivated the staff while on trial in 2012, the Guinean continued to be inspected but the opportunity fell through.

Luxembourg

Committing to Munsbach from US Mondorf-les-Bains at the end of the first half of 2014/15, the midfielder snatched five goals hosting Weiler late 2015 at the Luxembourg Cup.

References

External links

 at National-Football-Teams 
 at Soccerway 
 FC Munsbach Profile

Association football forwards
Bissau-Guinean expatriate footballers
1983 births
Living people
Bissau-Guinean emigrants to Portugal
Expatriate footballers in Cyprus
Expatriate footballers in Albania
F.C. Tirsense players
Kavala F.C. players
FK Kukësi players
Académico de Viseu F.C. players
Association football wingers
Bissau-Guinean footballers
Sportspeople from Conakry
Expatriate footballers in Greece
Alki Larnaca FC players
Cypriot Second Division players

Expatriate footballers in Luxembourg
CD Numancia players

Expatriate footballers in Spain
Association football midfielders
US Mondorf-les-Bains players
CS Grevenmacher players
Guinea-Bissau international footballers